Katherine Lucy Bridget Burke (born 13 June 1964) is an English actress, comedian, writer, producer, and director. She achieved fame with her appearances on sketch shows such as French and Saunders (1988–1999) and her recurring role as Magda on the BBC sitcom Absolutely Fabulous (1992–2012), as well as her frequent collaborations with fellow comedian Harry Enfield. From 1999 to 2001, she starred as Linda La Hughes on the BBC sitcom Gimme Gimme Gimme, for which she received a British Comedy Award and two BAFTA nominations.

Burke made her film debut in the 1982 drama Scrubbers. For her portrayal of Valerie in the 1997 film Nil by Mouth, she won Best Actress at the Cannes Film Festival and was nominated for a BAFTA for Best Actress in a Leading Role. Her other film appearances include Sid and Nancy (1986), Dancing at Lughnasa (1998), Elizabeth (1998), This Year's Love (1999), Kevin & Perry Go Large (2000), The Martins (2001), Anita and Me (2002), and Once Upon a Time in the Midlands (2002).  Having spent most of the 2000s concentrating on her work as a theatre director, she returned to film roles in the 2010s with Tinker Tailor Soldier Spy (2011), Pan (2015), and Absolutely Fabulous: The Movie (2016). Starting from 2019, Burke fronted a series of documentaries for Channel 4: Kathy Burke's All Woman (2019), Kathy Burke: Money Talks (2021) and Kathy Burke: Growing Up (2023).

Early life
Burke was born at the Royal Free Hospital, London on 13 June 1964, and was brought up in Islington, North London by her Irish Catholic parents Paddy and Bridget. She has two elder brothers. Her mother, known as Bridie, died of cancer when Burke was two years old. She lived with her father, a builder who was an alcoholic, and attended the Maria Fidelis Convent School, a secondary school in Euston, until she was 16 years old. She then studied at the Anna Scher Theatre School in Islington.

Career
Burke's first role was in the 1982 film Scrubbers, directed by Swedish actress Mai Zetterling and featuring Pam St. Clement, Robbie Coltrane, Miriam Margolyes, Honey Bane, Debby Bishop and Eva Mottley. The film was set in a young offenders' institute for girls and was seen as a female version of the film Scum.

Burke appeared in a non-speaking role in a 1985 public information film about heroin addiction. The following year she appeared in a non-speaking role as 'witness in doorway' in an award-winning advert for The Guardian'''s ‘Points of View’.

Burke first became familiar to television audiences as a player of minor roles in sketches by better-known performers such as Harry Enfield, Dawn French and Jennifer Saunders.  Early TV work included regular appearances on the chat show The Last Resort hosted by Jonathan Ross on UK Channel 4 in the mid-1980s, playing the characters 'Tina Bishop' and 'Perry the Pre-pubescent Schoolboy". Bishop was a continually pregnant "expert" offering advice on household chores, always with disastrous results. Along with French and Saunders, she has contributed to two Comic Relief charity singles. She first appeared as a member of Bananarama parody band Lananeeneenoonoo in 1989, and then as a member of Spice Girls' look-alike band the Sugar Lumps in 1997. In real life Burke is a big fan of Morrissey and appeared in the video for his 1989 single "Ouija Board, Ouija Board" and later in the 2002 Channel 4 documentary The Importance of Being Morrissey.

She quickly became successful in her own right and although mainly associated with comedy, she has played several serious roles including that of Queen Mary Tudor in the film Elizabeth, which was released in 1998.

In 1994 Burke was awarded the Royal Television Society Award for Best Actress, for her performance as the mute Martha in the 1993 BBC TV series Mr. Wroe's Virgins. The series was directed by Danny Boyle and is based on Jane Rogers' book about John Wroe. 

Burke won the Best Actress award at the 1997 Cannes Film Festival for her role in the gritty drama Nil by Mouth. Burke was so convinced she would not win that she made no plans to attend the ceremony; when told shortly beforehand she had won, she found her passport was out of date. The film also earned her a BAFTA nomination for Best Actress in a Leading Role. From 1999 to 2001 she appeared as Linda La Hughes in the BBC TV series Gimme Gimme Gimme (which she developed with writer Jonathan Harvey) where she was nominated for three British Comedy Awards (winning one), two BAFTA TV Awards and a National Television Award for her performance. In 2000, she appeared in the cult film Love Honour and Obey with Ray Burdis, and as Perry in the comedy film Kevin & Perry Go Large.In 2003, she was listed in The Observer as one of the 50 funniest acts in British comedy.

Beginning in 2001, she refrained from acting and threw herself into theatre directing; something she considers to be one of her true passions. She said in an interview with Dawn French in Dawn French's Girls Who do Comedy that she no longer felt the same creative energy associated with acting that she used to (she described it as a "feeling in my belly") and that this was the reason she had stopped acting. However, since then she has done some voiceover work, including UK TV adverts for Ski yoghurt (2005) and the voice of Rita's mum in the computer-animated film Flushed Away (2006). She also appeared in the 2007 Christmas Special of The Catherine Tate Show as Nan's daughter Diane.

In February 1990 she wrote and directed her first play, Mr Thomas, at the Old Red Lion Theatre. It was subsequently filmed and shown on Channel 4 the next year.

In 2007, Burke contracted Clostridium difficile while in hospital for an operation, resulting in her having to pass directing duties on Dying for It at the Almeida Theatre (which starred Charlie Condou and Sophie Stanton who she worked with on Gimme Gimme Gimme).

In 2009, Burke made her television directorial debut with the BBC Three sketch show series Horne & Corden, starring Mathew Horne and James Corden.

Burke wrote and appeared as a nun in a short autobiographical film, "Better Than Christmas", for Sky 1's Little Crackers, a collection of comic shorts that first aired in December 2010. On 19 January 2012, it was announced that Burke had written her first TV series; her short for Little Crackers had led to a four-part series, "Walking and Talking", based on her teenage years. Burke appeared as a nun in each episode of the series, which aired in the summer of 2012 on Sky Atlantic.

In 2011, Burke played Connie Sachs in the film adaptation of the novel Tinker, Tailor, Soldier, Spy. She was long-listed for a BAFTA nomination for her performance as Supporting Actress in 2012.

Burke appeared in the 2015 Peter Pan prequel film, Pan, as Mother Barnabas. In November 2015 Burke presented the BBC topical news panel show Have I Got News for You.

In 2019, Burke starred in her own self-titled three part documentary, Kathy Burke's All Woman. The programme aired on Channel 4 and focused on the stereotypes and expectations of modern women. Burke touched on subjects such as marriage, pregnancy and cosmetic surgery.

In 2021, Burke appeared as a guest judge in series 3 of RuPaul's Drag Race UK.

Burke directed ITV's four-part murder mystery series Holding, which premiered on 14 March 2022 and is based on Graham Norton's novel of the same name.

Filmography

Film

Television

Theatre

As actress

As director

Awards

References

External links
KathyBurke.co.uk

English film actresses
English people of Irish descent
English stage actresses
English voice actresses
English television actresses
English theatre directors
Actresses from London
People from Islington (district)
English women comedians
British comedy actresses
Comedians from London
Cannes Film Festival Award for Best Actress winners
1964 births
Living people
Alumni of the Anna Scher Theatre School
People from the London Borough of Camden
20th-century English actresses
21st-century English actresses
Women theatre directors